The Battle of Suru in 878 BC, was fought in the main fortress of Sukhu (Suhum), the Assyrians wrestled away the fortress from the Babylonian state.  Although the Assyrians claimed a great victory, this claim is doubted due to subsequent revolts in the middle Euphrates region, and because the Assyrian army under Ashurnasirpal II was never again reported as attacking as far into Sukhu. The Assyrians reportedly captured a contingent of Babylonian cavalry during this battle. This is one of few battles reported during this time period concerning Babylonian military affairs. This battle would lead to the rise of the Persians later on.

References

9th century BC
Suru
Suru
Suru
9th-century BC in Assyria